The Air Quality Modeling Group (AQMG) is in the U.S. EPA's Office of Air and Radiation (OAR) and provides leadership and direction on the full range of air quality models, air pollution dispersion models and other mathematical simulation techniques used in assessing pollution control strategies and the impacts of air pollution sources.

The AQMG serves as the focal point on air pollution modeling techniques for other EPA headquarters staff, EPA regional Offices, and State and local environmental agencies. It coordinates with the EPA's Office of Research and Development (ORD) on the development of new models and techniques, as well as wider issues of atmospheric research. Finally, the AQMG conducts modeling analyses to support the policy and regulatory decisions of the EPA's Office of Air Quality Planning and Standards (OAQPS).

The AQMG is located in Research Triangle Park, North Carolina.

Projects maintained by the AQMG

The AQMG maintains the following specific projects: 
 Air Quality Analyses to Support Modeling 
 Air Quality Modeling Guidelines
 Dispersion Modeling Computer Codes 
 Dispersion Modeling
 Emissions Inventories For Regional Modeling 
 Guidance on Modeling for New NAAQS & Regional Haze 
 Meteorological Data Guidance and Modeling 
 Model Clearinghouse
 Models-3/Community Multiscale Air Quality (CMAQ)
 Models3 Applications Team, Outreach and Training Coordination  
 Multimedia Modeling 
 PM Data Analysis and PM Modeling 
 Preferred/Recommended Models Alternative Models Screening Models
 Regional Ozone Modeling 
 Roadway Intersection Modeling 
 Support Center For Regulatory Air Models (SCRAM)
 Urban Ozone Modeling 
 Visibility and Regional Haze Modeling

See also

Accidental release source terms
Bibliography of atmospheric dispersion modeling
Air Quality Modelling and Assessment Unit (AQMAU)
Air Resources Laboratory
AP 42 Compilation of Air Pollutant Emission Factors
Atmospheric dispersion modeling
Atmospheric Studies Group
:Category:Atmospheric dispersion modeling
List of atmospheric dispersion models
Met Office
UK Atmospheric Dispersion Modelling Liaison Committee
UK Dispersion Modelling Bureau

References

Further reading
 www.crcpress.com
 www.air-dispersion.com

External links
 UK Dispersion Modelling Bureau web site
 UK ADMLC web site
 Air Resources Laboratory (ARL)
 Air Quality Modeling Group
 Met Office web site
 Error propagation in air dispersion modeling

Air pollution in the United States
Air pollution organizations
Atmospheric dispersion modeling
United States Environmental Protection Agency